Otira Methodist Home Missionary Training College was a residential college in Victoria, Australia, for training prospective Methodist ministers.

History
On his death the Methodist church was able to purchase the property at a favorable price, and was left a substantial sum in his will, specifically for the benefit of young trainee Methodist preachers, and by March 1925 already had twelve in residence, studying elementary theology under Rev. A. T. Holden.

Rev. T. C. Rentoul was assistant to Holden and was made principal on Holden's death.

References 

Seminaries and theological colleges in Australia
1925 establishments in Australia